In the 1997–98 season, MC Alger competed in the Division 1 for the 30th time They competed in Ligue 1, the Algerian Cup, and the Algerian League Cup.

Competitions

Overview

Division 1

League table

Results summary

Results by round

Matches

Algerian Cup

League Cup

Squad information

Appearances and goals

|-

Goalscorers
Includes all competitive matches. The list is sorted alphabetically by surname when total goals are equal.

References

External links
 1997–98 MC Alger season at sebbar.kazeo.com 

MC Alger seasons
Algerian football clubs 1997–98 season